Pachaug State Forest is the largest forest in the Connecticut state forest system, encompassing over 27,000 acres (110 km²) of land. It is located on the Rhode Island border in New London County, and parcels of the forest lie in the towns of Voluntown, Griswold, Plainfield, Sterling, North Stonington, and Preston. The forest was founded in 1928, but most of the land came from purchases made later during the Great Depression. It is named after the Pachaug River, which runs through the center of the forest. The forest is part of the Northeastern coastal forests ecoregion.

Features

Great Meadow
The Pachaug-Great Meadow Swamp portion of the park was declared a National Natural Landmark in May 1973 due to its Atlantic white cedar swamp. This type of forest is at risk of being succeeded by hemlock.

Hiking trails
There are four popular hiking trails, maintained by the Connecticut Forest and Park Association, that run through Pachaug State Forest.
It begins at the northern end of Pachaug Pond and ends at Green Fall Pond.  
The Nehantic Trail is a route just under  that begins at Green Fall Pond near the Pachaug Trail trailhead and runs northwest to RT 201 near the Pachaug River. 
The Narragansett Trail runs from the southwest to the northeast, starting from Lantern Hill in North Stonington.  The Narragansett Trail leaves the State Forest at the Connecticut/Rhode Island boundary; it enters Yawgoog Scout Reservation in Rhode Island and later ends at Ashville Pond in the village of Canonchet in Hopkinton, Rhode Island.

The handicap (wheelchair) accessible Rhododendron Sanctuary Trail (which includes a planked wooden boardwalk section) in the Pachaug State Forest's Herman Haupt Chapman Management Area is spectacularly scenic when the Rhododendron are in bloom (June and July).

There are several dirt and gravel road trails that cross Pachaug State Forest; Trail 1, Trail 2, the Main Drive, and Stonehill Road.  In combination with dozens of unmarked side trails, this makes for easy mountain biking terrain that has become popular among locals.

Some trails and roads are marked as multi-use.  One such is the Enduro off-road motorcycle trail which winds through Pachaug State Forest. On non–multi-use hiking trails in the forest, however, there is clearly both unauthorized vehicular and unauthorized equestrian use.

Motorcycling
The 58-mile Enduro trail in Pachaug State Forest is marked (on turns and intersections on trees) with white labels containing a red arrow pointing in the trail's direction. The route follows a mix of forest trails and public roads (therefore requiring both a valid current motorcycle registration and motorcycle driver's license rather than ATV registration).

References

External links 
Pachaug State Forest Connecticut Department of Energy and Environmental Protection
Pachaug State Forest Chapman Area Connecticut Department of Energy and Environmental Protection
Pachaug State Forest Chapman Area Map Connecticut Department of Energy and Environmental Protection
Pachaug State Forest Green Falls Area Connecticut Department of Energy and Environmental Protection
Pachaug State Forest Green Falls Area Map Connecticut Department of Energy and Environmental Protection
Pachaug Enduro Motorcycle Route Map Connecticut Department of Energy and Environmental Protection
Pachaug State Forest Map Connecticut Explorer's Guide

Connecticut state forests
Parks in New London County, Connecticut
Hiking trails in Connecticut
National Natural Landmarks in Connecticut
Protected areas established in 1928
Voluntown, Connecticut
Griswold
Plainfield
Sterling
North Stonington
Preston
Campgrounds in Connecticut
1928 establishments in Connecticut